Tingler is a surname.  Notable people with the name include:

Jayce Tingler (born 1980), American baseball manager
Philipp Tingler (born 1970), Swiss and German writer
Richard Lee Tingler, an FBI most wanted fugitive listee in 1968, see FBI Ten Most Wanted Fugitives by year, 1968

See also
Tingley (disambiguation), includes a list of people with surname Tingley